Tifanny Janea McCarty (born December 14, 1990) is an American soccer forward who plays for Þór/KA in the Úrvalsdeild kvenna. She previously played for the Houston Dash, and FC Kansas City, and Washington Spirit in the NWSL as well as Albirex Niigata Ladies in Japan's Nadeshiko League and Medkila IL in Norway.

Early life
McCarty attended St. John's College High School, where she finished her high school career as the all-time leading scorer in goals (191) and assists (74). Her 191 goals broke the Washington Metro area (including Washington D.C., Maryland and Virginia) scoring record. She led the WCAC Conference in scoring for four straight years while guiding St. Johns to two WCAC Conference Championships. In 2008, she was named a PARADE All-American. She was a three-time NSCAA/adidas High School All-American and a two-time NSCAA/adidas Youth All-American. She was named NSCAA/adidas South Regional All-American (2005–07) and State Player of the Year in the District of Columbia from 2005 to 2007. She was named Gatorade Player of the Year in the District of Columbia from 2005 to 2007.  McCarty was named a top 25 recruit by Soccer Buzz and was a member of the Maryland state Olympic Development Program (ODP) squad from 2002 to 2007. She was also a member of the Region I Regional Team from 2003 to 2007. McCarty captained the ODP Regional championship team in 2005 and helped the Maryland squad to the 2006 ODP national championship.

McCarty also played with the club team, Freestate Shooters. In 2004, she helped the team win the 2004 Maryland state cup championship. In 2007, as captain of the team, she led the team to the 2007 Region I Premier League championship and the 2007 US Club Soccer national championship.

Florida State Seminoles, 2008–2012
McCarty attended Florida State University, where she played for the Seminoles for four years, making 98 appearances, scoring 63 goals and providing 24 assists. She was a semifinalist for the MAC Hermann Trophy in 2009 and 2011.

Club career

Washington Freedom, 2007–2009
McCarty was striker for the Washington Freedom of the W-League for three seasons in 2007, 2008 and 2009 capturing the league championship in 2007. She scored a goal in the championship match against the Atlanta Silverbacks and earned W-League Team of the Week Honorable Mention honors in 2009.

Pali Blues, 2011
McCarty played for the Pali Blues of the W-League during the summer of 2011.

Washington Spirit, 2013
McCarty was selected in the first round (second overall) of the 2013 NWSL College Draft by the Washington Spirit for the inaugural season of the National Women's Soccer League. During the team's first regular season match against the Boston Breakers, she scored the team's lone goal.

Loan to Albirex Niigata, 2013
On September 25, 2013, Tiffany McCarty was loaned out to Nadeshiko League club Albirex Niigata Ladies in Japan.

Houston Dash, 2014–2015
On January 10, 2014, the Houston Dash selected McCarty with the second pick in the 2014 NWSL Expansion Draft.

FC Kansas City, 2016
On January 13, 2016, McCarty was traded to FC Kansas City along with Jessica McDonald for the 8th overall pick in the 2016 NWSL College Draft. McCarty would choose not to play for FC Kansas City in the 2017 season, opting to play in Norway instead.

Medkila IL, 2017–2018
McCarty signed with Medkila IL in the Toppserien. The Team was relegated following a 12th-place finish in the 2017 season.

Washington Spirit, 2018
On August 30, 2018, McCarty was signed as a National Team Replacement Player by the Washington Spirit for their final game of the 2018 NWSL Season and ended up playing 70 minutes in that September 2 match. McCarty was named to Washington's roster ahead of the 2019 NWSL season.

Iceland
McCarty played with Selfoss in the summer of 2020, scoring 9 goals in 16 Úrvalsdeild games, and with Breiðablik in 2021 where she netted 8 goals in 17 games. McCarty won the Icelandic Cup with Breiðablik and scored in the cup final. In January 2022, she signed with Þór/KA.

International career
McCarty has represented the United States at various youth levels, including Under-17s, Under-18s Under-20s. In 2013, she was a member of the United States under-23 women's national soccer team that won the Four Nations Tournament in La Manga Club, Spain.

Awards

 NWSL Goal of the Week: Week 20, 2019

References

External links 

 Washington Spirit player profile
 Florida Seminoles player profile

1990 births
Living people
21st-century African-American sportspeople
21st-century African-American women
African-American women's soccer players
Albirex Niigata Ladies players
American expatriate sportspeople in Japan
American expatriate sportspeople in Iceland
American expatriate women's soccer players
American women's soccer players
Breiðablik women's football players
Expatriate women's footballers in Iceland
Expatriate women's footballers in Japan
Expatriate women's footballers in Norway
FC Kansas City players
Florida State Seminoles women's soccer players
Pali Blues players
People from Laurel, Maryland
Medkila IL (women) players
Nadeshiko League players
National Women's Soccer League players
Soccer players from Maryland
Selfoss women's football players
Soccer players from Washington, D.C.
Toppserien players
United States women's under-20 international soccer players
Úrvalsdeild kvenna (football) players
Þór/KA players
Washington Spirit draft picks
Washington Spirit players
Women's association football forwards